Howard Gerald "Jerry" Clower (September 28, 1926 – August 24, 1998) was an American stand-up comedian. Born and raised in the state of Mississippi, Clower was best known for his stories of the rural South and was given the nickname "The Mouth of Mississippi".

Life
Clower was born in Liberty, Mississippi and began a two-year stint in the Navy after graduating from high school in 1944. Upon his discharge, in 1946, he was a Radioman Third Class (RMN3) and had earned the American Campaign Medal, the Asiatic-Pacific Campaign Medal (with two bronze service stars), and the World War II Victory Medal.

He studied agriculture at Mississippi State University, where he played college football and was a member of Phi Kappa Tau fraternity. After finishing school in 1951, Clower worked as a county agent and later as a seed salesman. He became a fertilizer salesman for Mississippi Chemical in 1954.

Career
By 1954, Clower had developed a reputation for telling funny stories to boost his sales. Tapes of Clower's speaking engagements wound up in the hands of Edwin "Big Ed" Wilkes and Bud Andrews in Lubbock, Texas, who had him make a better-quality recording which they promoted. MCA Records later awarded The Coon Hunt a platinum record for sales in excess of $1 million at the retail level.

At first, Clower took orders at his speaking engagements, selling 8000 copies on the Lemon record label. In time, Wilkes sent a copy to Grant Turner at WSM radio in Nashville, and when Turner played it on the air, Clower said "that thing busted loose." MCA was soon knocking on Clower's door, offering him a contract. Once MCA began distribution in 1971, Jerry Clower from Yazoo City, Mississippi Talkin''' retailed more than a million dollars over 10 months and stayed in the top 20 on the country charts for 30 weeks.

Clower's first on-stage engagement occurred in the early 1970s when country radio station owner and show promoter, Marshall Rowland (WQIK, Jacksonville; WDEN, Macon; WQYK, Tampa), received an early Clower recording ("The Coon Huntin' Story") which was met with rave reviews by his station's listeners in Jacksonville. Rowland contacted Clower and offered him an airplane ticket and a few hundred dollars to come open for an upcoming tour Rowland had booked with Charley Pride.  Clower arrived back-stage for the Saturday night show at the Jacksonville Coliseum, but Pride's manager Jack Johnson refused to allow it because Clower was non-union. Rowland averted the situation by putting Clower on stage while the lights were up and people were still entering the Coliseum. Clower performed for about 30 minutes. Pride, who watched from backstage, is said to have then taken Clower under his wing and introduced him at the next of Rowland's shows as his "new friend." Clower and Rowland remained very close friends for the years that followed, connecting for events, and working shows together. Clower was a frequent face at Rowland's radio stations over the remaining years of his life, and the music was known to be interrupted with Clower's comedy recordings from time to time, especially at WQIK in Jacksonville, where his career can be said to have been launched in earnest.

His stories often featured the Ledbetters, a quintessential Southern, country folk. Clower made 27 full-length recordings in his 27-year career as a professional entertainer (not counting "best of" compilations). With one exception, all the recordings were released by MCA. The exception was Ain't God Good, which Clower recorded with MCA's blessing at a worship service. Word Records promoted and distributed this title in 1977. This recording gave Clower, always a staunch Christian, an opportunity to present his personal testimony in a comfortable church setting. Clower was well known for his faith and often makes references to God in his stories. He spoke at many Southern Baptist Convention events. He said his faith kept him happy and able to make others laugh.

In 1973, Clower became a member of the Grand Ole Opry, and continued to perform there regularly until his death. He also co-hosted a radio show called Country Crossroads with Bill Mack and Leroy Van Dyke, which has aired in syndication for 40 years and a television version of the program was produced, as well, starting in 1993. Clower's involvement began in 1973 and lasted well over 20 years. This show was produced and distributed by the Southern Baptist Convention.

Clower also taped segments of Nashville On the Road, which included comedic performances and interviews with other country artists featured on the show. Jim Ed Brown hosted the series with Clower during the program's first season, 1975–76, and they were joined by Helen Cornelius in 1976. Their involvement in the series lasted until 1981. The show continued to air with new host Jim Stafford through 1983.
Clower's last album was Peaches and Possums, released posthumously in October 1998. He was the author of four books. The book Ain't God Good became the basis for an inspirational documentary film of the same title that won an award from the New York International Independent Film and Video Festival. His other three books include 1978's Let the Hammer Down; 1987's Life Everlaughter, and 1993's Stories From Home''.

Death
Clower died in August 1998 following heart bypass surgery; he was 71 years old. He had been married to Homerline (née Wells) Clower (1926–2018) since August 1947. He had a son, Ray (1953–2011), and three daughters.

Discography

References

External links
 
 
 Jerry Clower discography, musicscribe.com; accessed August 31, 2014.
 

1926 births
1998 deaths
American male singer-songwriters
American country singer-songwriters
American radio personalities
American stand-up comedians
American religious writers
Baptists from Mississippi
Grand Ole Opry members
Mississippi State University alumni
People from Liberty, Mississippi
People from Yazoo City, Mississippi
Writers from Mississippi
United States Navy personnel of World War II
20th-century American singers
20th-century American non-fiction writers
Singer-songwriters from Mississippi
Southern Baptists
20th-century American comedians
Country musicians from Mississippi
20th-century American male singers
United States Navy sailors
Military personnel from Mississippi
20th-century Baptists
20th-century American male writers
Comedians from Mississippi